L'Express (lit. "The Express") was a Swiss regional French-language daily newspaper published in Neuchâtel.

Originally founded in 1738 as Feuille d'avis de Neuchatel, it was the oldest still-published French-language newspaper in the world, before it was merged in 2018 with L'Impartial ("The Impartial"), another Swiss French-language paper, to form ArcInfo.
 
L'Express covered international, national and local issues, including local exhibitions. The newspaper's circulation was 28,490 in 2003.

See also
List of newspapers in Switzerland

References

External links
 L'ExpressArchives.ch searchable archive of L'Express (1738–2018), L'Impartial (1881–2018) and ArcInfo (2018–present)
 

French-language newspapers published in Switzerland
Mass media in Neuchâtel
Publications established in 1738
1738 establishments in Europe
18th-century establishments in Switzerland
Publications disestablished in 2018
Defunct daily newspapers